KDRL may refer to:

 KDRL (FM), a radio station (103.3 FM) licensed to Pampa, Texas, United States
 Kansandemokraattinen raittiusliitto, a Finnish temperance movement